Polemonium viscosum, known as sky pilot, skunkweed, sticky Jacobs-ladder, and sticky polemonium, is a flowering plant in the genus Polemonium native to western North America from southern British Columbia east to Montana and south to Arizona and New Mexico, where it grows at high altitudes on dry, rocky sites.

It is a perennial herbaceous plant growing 10–30 cm tall, with pinnate leaves up to 15 cm long with numerous small spoon-shaped leaflets 1.5–6 mm long and 1–3 mm broad. It has purple flowers 17–25 mm long.

It is grown as an ornamental plant in rock gardens.

References

Plants of British Columbia: Polemonium viscosum
NRCS: USDA Plants Profile Polemonium viscosum, Range Map-(w/out CA): 

viscosum
Flora of Arizona
Flora of Colorado
Flora of Idaho
Flora of Montana
Flora of New Mexico
Flora of Nevada
Flora of Oregon
Flora of Utah
Flora of Washington (state)
Flora of Wyoming
Flora of Alberta
Flora of British Columbia
Flora without expected TNC conservation status